Sewells Group is a global consulting and outsourcing company specialising in the automotive retail industry, with presence in Asia Pacific, Africa and the Middle East regions.

Overview

Sewells Group works with auto manufactures and their dealers and helps them improve their business performance, in areas such as dealership profit improvement, dealership operational improvement along with training and competence development of dealership and manufacturer employees. Some of Sewells Group performance models and tools such as MRA Business Management Model, eSOS financial reporting system, Lead-Lag Process Efficacy Model & Action learning model are used by thousands of dealerships across the world.

Sewells Group also trains the motor technicians of the manufacturers at their dealerships and works with governments to promote automotive vocational education. The company also organises motor dealer study tours and names the Businessman of the Year for motor dealers in some markets like South Africa. The Sewells Group has worked with many prominent automobile companies such as Hyundai, Royal Enfield, BMW, Jaguar, Tata and many more.

History

The origin of Sewells Group can be traced back to the UK where, in 1970, Ronald Sewell established a financial services consultancy. In the early 1980s, he started a similar business in South Africa. In 1986, WesBank invested in Sewells Group with a view to providing finance and insurance training to motor dealers in South Africa.

In 1988, Sewells Group shifted away from offering pure training to offering performance enhancement solution to motor dealerships. A few years later, in the early 1990s, Sewells Group South Africa and Sewells Group UK agreed to operate as independent entities. At about the same time, the group evolved its business model to three primary dealer support services: Profitability and Business Management, Consulting and Training. Dealership Performance Groups where dealers got together to share best practices were also incorporated into the product offering, initially with five dealers in South Africa, then reaching a number of about 500. By the late 1990s, Sewells Group became an authority figure for automotive financial benchmarking in South Africa with over 700 dealer datasets. In 1998, Sewells Group implemented its Dealer Development Model, focusing on network health and human resource development.

In 2000, Sewells Group South Africa opened a branch in New Zealand, which from the following year led also to important projects in Australia. In 2002/2003 Sewells Group continued to expand its Australian operation, forming partnerships with several major OEMs. Sewells Group Thailand was established in 2007, with offices in Bangkok then, in 2010, Sewells Group China, with offices in Shanghai and, in 2012, Sewells Group Indonesia, with offices in Jakarta.

In 2009, Sewells Group established a partnership with Idea7 in India as an entry point into the Indian market. In 2011, Sewells Group acquired Idea7.

References

External links
 

International management consulting firms
Business services companies established in 1970
Automotive intelligence companies
Outsourcing companies